Banshee Chapter (sometimes referred to as The Banshee Chapter) is a 2013 American horror film and the directorial debut of Blair Erickson. The film had its first screening at the Fantasy Filmfest on August 22, 2013, and released on video on demand on December 12 of the same year. Banshee Chapter stars Katia Winter as a journalist who is trying to discover what happened to a missing friend. The film is loosely based on the H. P. Lovecraft short story "From Beyond".

Plot

James Hirsch, a young man, is investigating the government experiment Project MKUltra. With a friend filming him, James takes the drug used in the experiments, dimethyltryptamine-19 (DMT-19). Bizarre music and voices broadcast from a nearby radio. A shadowy figure comes and leaves James with all-black eyes and a disfigured face.

Anne, a reporter who attended college with James, is concerned over his disappearance. James's friend also mysteriously disappeared a few days after he was questioned by the police. Anne investigates James's house and discovers a betamax cassette that contains footage of the MKUltra experiments as well as a book of notes about the project. Anne goes to a local expert and discovers that the bizarre radio broadcast heard by James is a phantom radio station which can only be tuned into in the desert, at a certain time of night. Anne drives out into the desert after dark and picks up the broadcast, but flees when a monstrous form appears from the darkness.

Anne discovers that a mention of "Friends in Colorado" in James's notes is related to counter-culture writer Thomas Blackburn, who is known for his drug use and unpredictable behavior. She contacts him by phone and is angrily rebuffed when she mentions Project MKUltra. Anne travels to Blackburn's home and lies to gain his confidence. Thomas sees through her ruse and tricks her into taking DMT-19 that his friend Callie made. Anne is angry at the deception, and Callie begins exhibiting the same behaviors and disfigurement that James did. Anne hears the bizarre music played by the phantom station, goes to investigate, and is attacked by a strange entity. Anne and Thomas awaken to find Callie missing. They head to Callie's house to find out more about the DMT-19. Anne is nearly captured by Callie, who is now controlled by the entity. She and Thomas realize that DMT-19 works as a "radio antenna" that allows otherworldly entities to broadcast signals to people on the drug as well as take over their bodies. The government never came up with DMT-19 but instead received instructions from the otherworldly entities and made the drug without realizing the full implication of their actions. In addition to the base chemical compound, scientists were adding harvested material from the pineal gland of a female corpse, dubbed the "Primary Source", who returned to life during an experiment and attacked one of the doctors.

Anne realizes the signal is likely coming from the laboratory that performed the Project MKUltra experiments. Thomas reveals that he lied about giving her DMT-19. Realizing that the entity will pursue her regardless, Anne resolves to end the broadcast. She and Thomas travel into the desert and discover the laboratory in an abandoned fallout shelter, taking a can of gasoline to burn whatever they find. Inside, they discover a room full of radio equipment and a large tank. A pale figure with black eyes resides within a small porthole built into the side (implied to be the "Primary Source"). The radio equipment comes to life and broadcasts the numbers station.

Anne hunts for the gasoline can, avoiding a grotesque figure who chases her. Thomas begins to bleed from the eyes and convulse. Apologizing to Anne, he shoots himself in the head. In a frenzy, Anne smashes open the porthole in the tank, pours the gasoline inside, and throws a lighter scavenged from Thomas' corpse. The resulting explosion knocks Anne unconscious. When she comes to, she finds the clothing worn by James before his disappearance lying outside in the hallway, implying that the creature chasing her was "wearing" James.

Anne is taken into police custody and one of her co-workers visits. She and Anne discuss the tape that Anne discovered. Part of the tape was erased, but was retrieved by a video forensics company. Anne cannot understand why James's friend disappeared, as he never took the drug. She hears the phantom broadcast issuing from the intercom and realizes that the effects of the drug can be passed along by human touch, as she still saw the creatures despite never having taken the drug. She turns to discover that her co-worker (whose hand she held moments before) has been taken over by the entities. Recovered footage on the tape reveals that a college-age Thomas Blackburn was a test subject in Project MKUltra.

Cast
Ted Levine as Thomas Blackburn
Katia Winter as Anne Roland
Michael McMillian as James Hirsch
Monique Candelaria as Patient 14
Chad Brummett as Dr. Kessle
Jenny Gabrielle as Callie
J.D. Garfield as Elderly Doctor
Alex Gianopoulos as Renny Seegan
David Midthunder as Raoul
Vivian Nesbitt as Olivia Kmiec
Ben Samuels as Science Editor
Cyd Schulte as Laura Henrik
William Sterchi as Henry Cale

Production
While creating Banshee Chapter, writer/director Blair Erickson was inspired by H. P. Lovecraft's short story "From Beyond", as well as the history of hallucinogenic drug experiments performed by the United States Government. Ted Levine was one of the first people cast for the movie, but casting the lead of Anne was more difficult and Erickson said he auditioned "several hundred" women before deciding on Katia Winter. Erickson also experienced difficulty with the film's limited budget and filming timeline, as they only had 28 days to film Banshee Chapter. As a result, some characters were eliminated from the beginning of the script in order to fit the limited shooting schedule.

Reception

Critical reception for Banshee Chapter has been mostly positive and the film holds a rating of 77% on Rotten Tomatoes based upon 22 reviews. Common praise for the film centered around Winter and Levine's performances, with both Screen Daily and Fearnet marking the performances as a highlight.

References

External links
 
 
 

2013 films
2013 horror films
2010s monster movies
American monster movies
American horror films
Films based on works by H. P. Lovecraft
Works about Project MKUltra
2010s English-language films
2010s American films